Angonyx testacea, the northern dark-green hawkmoth, is a moth of the family Sphingidae.

Distribution 
It is found in Nepal, northern India, the Andaman Islands, Myanmar, southern China, Taiwan, Thailand, Vietnam, Malaysia (Peninsular, Sarawak), Indonesia (Sumatra, Java, Kalimantan) and Philippines (Palawan, Luzon). The isolated population in southern India and Sri Lanka is a separate species, namely Angonyx krishna.

Description 
The wingspan is 54–64 mm.

Biology 
There are several generations per year in Hong Kong, with adults on wing from mid-February to early July, and again from late August to early January, with peaks in April, June, mid-October and late November.

The larvae have been recorded on Strychnos nux-vomica in India.

References

Angonyx
Moths described in 1856
Moths of Asia